Yeo is a surname. Yeo or YEO may also refer to:

Rivers 
 Barnstaple Yeo, a tributary of the River Taw in Devon, UK
 Cheddar Yeo, a tributary of the River Axe in Somerset, UK 
 Congresbury Yeo, a tributary of the Severn Estuary in Somerset, UK
 Land Yeo, a tributary of the Bristol Channel in Somerset, UK 
 Lapford Yeo, a tributary of the River Taw in Devon, UK
 Lox Yeo, a tributary of the River Axe in Somerset, UK 
 Mark Yeo, a tributary of the River Axe in Somerset, UK 
 River Yeo, Molland, a tributary to the River Mole in Devon, UK
 River Yeo (South Somerset), a river in Somerset, UK, and which joins the River Parrett near Langport
 River Yeo (tributary of the Creedy) in Devon, UK
 River Yeo (tributary of the Torridge) in Devon, UK

Places 
 Yeo Island, British Columbia, Canada
 Yeo Lake, Western Australia, Australia
 Yeo Yeo, New South Wales, Australia

Companies and organisations 
 Yeo Hiap Seng, an investment holding company commonly known as Yeo's
 YEO, the original name for the non-profit Entrepreneurs' Organization
 Yeo Valley Organic, a dairy business based in Somerset, UK
 "Yeo Valley Rap", a song from an advertisement by Yeo Valley Organic that entered the UK music charts in 2010

Transport 
 Yeo (locomotive), a British narrow gauge railway locomotive built in 1897
 Yeo Mill railway station, a former railway station in Devon, UK
 YEO, the IATA code for RNAS Yeovilton (HMS Heron), a Royal Navy airfield in Somerset, UK 
 YEO, the National Rail code for Yeoford railway station in Devon, UK

See also